Sevgül Uludağ (pronounced ooh-loo-dah); born October 15, 1958) is a Turkish Cypriot journalist, as well as a peace and gender activist. Born in Nicosia in 1958, Uludağ worked in a bank, and later as a proofreader, before she became a journalist in 1980. Working as an investigative reporter, she has been instrumental in uncovering information on thousands of missing Cypriots. In addition, she has also written a number of books. She is a 2008 Courage in Journalism Award laureate, the first Cypriot winner of this award. She co-founded two NGOs, Hands Across the Divide, and the Women's Research Center in Nicosia.
The activist and journalist was nominated for the Nobel Peace prize in 2019 for her work on missing people and refugees on the island of Cyprus.

Selected works
Oysters with the Missing Pearls (2005) 
Orphans of Nationalism (2008)

References

1958 births
Living people
Turkish Cypriot non-fiction writers
Turkish Cypriot journalists
Cypriot women writers
Cypriot women journalists
Cypriot women columnists
People from North Nicosia
21st-century women writers
Turkish Cypriot columnists
Türk Maarif Koleji alumni
Turkish women columnists
Turkish Cypriot women